"Doin' the Do" is a song by English singer, songwriter and pop-rap artist Betty Boo. The song is included on her debut album, Boomania (1990), and was released as a single in May 1990. It reached the top 10 in Australia, Belgium, Ireland, the Netherlands, New Zealand, Spain, and the United Kingdom.

Release
"Doin the Do" was Boo's debut solo single, and second overall release, following her collaboration with the Beatmasters on their song "Hey DJ/I Can't Dance (To That Music You're Playing)" in 1989. The song samples portions of the 1968 single "Captain of Your Ship" by the American girl group Reparata and the Delrons and "I'm a Believer" by The Monkees.

The single charted at number seven in the UK and also reached number three in Australia. In the US, "Doin' the Do" went to number one on the dance chart and also crossed over to the Billboard Hot 100 chart, where it peaked at 90 in November 1990.

An authorised remix of the song was created for the opening credits of the Bitmap Brothers game, Magic Pockets.

Critical reception
Alex Henderson from AllMusic said that "melodic, escapist club hits", like "Doin' the Do", "have a lot more bite and substance than the music of Vanilla Ice and Icy Blu." Larry Flick from Billboard remarked that this hip-house jam has been buzzing along the club underground as an import for a while now, "thanks to Boo's amusing rhyming and tune's brain-imbedding chorus. Pop-spiced remixes by Pettibone should add to crossover radio incentive. Do it up." A reviewer from Cashbox stated, "This combination of dance grooves and silliness works very well". Dave Sholin from the Gavin Report commented, "First heard about this entry a few months ago when it was the rage in England. The "Booster" is Top Three in the U.K. with her follow-up track while this clever and catchy rap 'n pop combo is set to make an explosive debut Stateside. Song and video scream FUN!" 

David Giles from Music Week wrote that Boo "kicks off her solo career with a twangy rap, cute backing noises and a hook-laden production from former benefactors The Beatmasters. Rhythm King must be counting on this one and it's certainly crossed far enough over to be a large hit." Gene Sandbloom from The Network Forty said that somewhere between Diana Rigg and Pebbles, "this 19-year-old from Britain enrolled in sound engineering school so she could produce records her own way." David Quantick  from NME felt that "Doin' The Do" "is a sparky sort of thing whose rhythm endearingly suggests the bit on the Chart Show where the runaway train goes over the hill, choo choo."

Charts and certifications

Weekly charts

Year-end charts

Sales and certifications

Further reading

References

1990 debut singles
1990 songs
Betty Boo songs
Songs written by Betty Boo
Songs written by Kenny Young
Warner Records singles
Hip house songs
Number-one singles in Israel